Harry Gamboa Jr. (born 1951) is an American Chicano essayist, photographer, director, and performance artist. He was a founding member of the influential Chicano performance art collective ASCO.

Biography
The first of five children born to a working-class Mexican-American couple, Gamboa grew up in East Los Angeles, California, "an urban area tormented by poverty, violence, and racial conflict". Despite the "inadequacy of the East L.A. public schools", Gamboa was encouraged to value education and did fairly well in school, and he was active in community organizations and politics as a teenager. As a high-school student (graduated 1969), Gamboa was active in student government and an organizer of various student-initiated reforms, most significantly the 1968 "East L.A. Blowouts"—a series of protests against the inferior conditions of public schools in poor, non-white areas.

Already a developing artist, it was at Garfield High that Gamboa met Gronk (Glugio Nicandro), Patssi Valdez (then known as Patsy), and Willie Herrón, three of his closest associates in his later career. After the "Blowouts" of his senior year, Gamboa dropped out of the political scene to dedicate himself to his education. Thanks to these efforts and with the help of the Equal Opportunities Program (EOP) for disadvantaged minority students, Gamboa was able to attend California State University, Los Angeles.

From this point, his career as an artist—both solo and with Gronk, Valdez, and Herrón in the art collective ASCO (Spanish for nausea) —"took off". Among other "urban interventions," Asco sprayed their names on the Los Angeles County Museum of Art.

In 1993 Gamboa married his second wife, Chicana muralist Barbara Carrasco, after seven years of romantic and professional involvement. His work has been exhibited by museums nationally/internationally. He has taught, lectured, and/or delivered artist talks and/or panel discussions at various universities and art institutions

Publications 

 Urban Exile: Collected Writings of Harry Gamboa Jr. (1998) (ISBN 978-0816630523)
 Rider (2009) (ISBN 978-1448670307)
 Xoloitzcuintli Doppelganger and other stories (2018) (ISBN 978-1724629906)
 Striking Distance (2020) (ISBN  979-8669765798)

References 

American artists of Mexican descent
American video artists
1951 births
Living people
American essayists